The Glacier Ice Rink is a two-sheet ice arena located in Missoula, Montana, on the Missoula County Fairgrounds. The rink and its programs are operated by the Missoula Area Youth Hockey Association (MAYHA), a non-profit organization for promoting ice sports. The rink is open 10 months a year and offers youth and adult hockey leagues, hockey tournaments, and public skating sessions. Glacier Ice Rink is also home to the Missoula Figure Skating Club, the Missoula Curling Club, the Missoula Referees Association, the Women's Hockey Association of Missoula (WHAM) and the University of Montana men's hockey team. The ice is removed each summer for the Western Montana Fair.

From 2007 to 2016, the rink was home to the Missoula Maulers junior hockey team before the team owner and MAYHA had a contract dispute and the team was disbanded. The Maulers' owner Michael Burks had installed all the bleachers at the ice rink with his own funding, so after failing to negotiate a new contract, he removed the bleachers, forcing Glacier Ice Rink to raise funds for replacement seating. The Maulers were replaced with an expansion team in the North American 3 Hockey League named the Missoula Jr. Bruins with new owners Jason and Liz DiMatteo. The Jr. Bruins' franchise was sold in 2021 and relocated to Rapid City, South Dakota, as the Badlands Sabres.

Tenants
Missoula Figure Skating Club
Missoula Curling Club
Missoula Referees Association
Women's Hockey Association of Missoula (WHAM)
University of Montana men's hockey team

Previous tenants
Missoula Maulers
Missoula Jr. Bruins

References

External links

1996 establishments in Montana
Sports venues completed in 1996
Sports venues in Missoula, Montana
Indoor ice hockey venues in Montana